Melopla is a genus of moths in the family Lasiocampidae. It was erected by Yves de Lajonquière in 1972.

Species
Melopla abhorrens de Lajonquière, 1972
Melopla ochracea Viette, 1962
Melopla sparsipuncta Viette, 1962

References

Lasiocampidae